Paul Francis Kossoff (14 September 1950 – 19 March 1976) was an English guitarist who was as the co-founder and guitarist for the rock band Free. He was ranked number 51 in Rolling Stones list of the "100 Greatest Guitarists of All Time".

Early years 
Kossoff was born on 14 September 1950 in Hampstead, London, the son of Margaret (née Jenkins) and actor David Kossoff. His uncle was the broadcaster Alan Keith and he was a cousin of the judge Brian Keith and the model Linda Keith.

Aged nine Kossoff started classical guitar lessons with Blanche Monroe. His classical guitar training continued until he was fifteen. In December 1965 he saw Eric Clapton with John Mayall's Bluesbreakers at The Refectory, Golders Green, North West London. This encounter inspired him to purchase a Gibson Les Paul guitar.
During 1966 Kossoff worked as a junior salesman at Selmer's Music Shop in Charing Cross Road. He received lessons from session guitarist Colin Falconer, who worked in the guitar department at Selmer's.

In 1966 Kossoff joined the Chicago-style blues band Black Cat Bones. The band played with touring blues piano player Champion Jack Dupree, often supporting Fleetwood Mac and other gigs with Fleetwood Mac co-founder Peter Green. Kossoff's bandmate in Black Cat Bones was drummer Simon Kirke and the two went on to play on Champion Jack Dupree's April 1968 album When You Feel the Feeling You Was Feeling.

Free 

In April 1968, Kossoff and Kirke teamed up with Paul Rodgers (vocals) and Andy Fraser (bass) to form Free. They toured for two years, during which they recorded two albums: Tons of Sobs (1968) and Free (1969). Both albums showcased the band's blues- and soul-influenced sound, a style that was in contrast to some of their progressive and heavier counterparts at the time.

Success came in 1970 when their third album, Fire and Water (1970), spawned the hit "All Right Now". The band played the Isle of Wight festival to both audience and critical acclaim and sellout tours in the United Kingdom, Europe and Japan followed.

However, after the release of the next album, Highway (1970) and its relatively poor sales, band pressures led to a split. The live album Free Live! was recorded in 1970 and released in 1971 as a farewell record.

Kossoff and Kirke teamed up with Texan keyboard player John "Rabbit" Bundrick and Japanese bass player Tetsu Yamauchi to release the 1971 album Kossoff, Kirke, Tetsu and Rabbit. Rodgers and Fraser pursued unsuccessful solo projects.

Free reformed and released the album Free at Last (1972). Following its release, Fraser decided he had had enough and quit to form Sharks. Free drafted Tetsu and Rabbit for the album Heartbreaker (1973) after which the group disbanded.

Kossoff song-writing 
Kossoff co-wrote several Free songs, including "Oh I Wept" and "Mr Big" on the Fire and Water album.

After Free 
Rodgers and Kirke went on to form the successful Bad Company.

Kossoff released a solo album, Back Street Crawler (1973). He then accompanied John Martyn on a 1975 tour.

Kossoff then assembled a group called Back Street Crawler, which released two albums: The Band Plays On in 1975 and 2nd Street in 1976. Recordings from one of the band's UK concerts in 1975 were first released in 1983 on the album Live at Croydon Fairfield Halls 15/6/75.

Kossoff's guitar playing was also much in demand for session work and he contributed solos on several albums including:  Martha Veléz's Fiends and Angels (1969); Michael Gately's Gately's Cafe (1971) and Mike Vernon's 1971 album Bring It Back Home; Uncle Dog's Old Hat (1972); Jim Capaldi's Oh How We Danced (1972) and Short Cut Draw Blood (1975); The Amazing Blondel's Mulgrave Street (1974).

He also played on four demos by Ken Hensley (eventually released on the 1994 album titled From Time to Time) and three tracks that appear on the CD-only issue of John Martyn's Live at Leeds album from 1975.

Posthumous releases 
In 1977 career retrospective Koss was released and in 1986 Blue Soul.

The late 1990s saw a renewed interest in Kossoff and Blue Soul was re-released, as well as the five-disc Free box set Songs of Yesterday.

In 2006, an unreleased guitar solo surfaced on the title track to the album All One by David Elliot, who recorded with Kossoff in the 1970s.

In 2011 a selection of early recordings Kossoff made with Black Cat Bones was released on the album Paul's Blues.

Books 
In 2000 a Free biography entitled Heavy Load: The Story of Free was published.

2017 saw publication of the Paul Kossoff biography entitled Paul Kossoff: All Right Now – The Guitars, The Gear, The Music.

Personal life

Drug use 
Kossoff used drugs from age 15. Simon Kirke has said "he clearly had a predisposition." He used Mandrax among other drugs. Paul Rodgers has said Kossoff was healthy and playing well in 1973 although this is disputed, but that he wonders about the company that Kossoff kept, and felt that "Koss was just too sensitive for this world."

Kossoff's drug use made him unreliable in the latter stages of Free. Andy Fraser noted "he felt intimidated by those other guitarists, and when people began speaking of him in terms of Clapton and so on, it frightened him. Drugs were a defence, his excuse".

Death 
Kossoff's unhappiness following the break-up of Free and his drug addictions contributed to a drastic decline in his health.
In a BBC website page about the 1970 death of Jimi Hendrix, Simon Kirke said that Kossoff idolised Hendrix and never really recovered from his death.

Kossoff died on a flight from Los Angeles to New York City on 19 March 1976 from a pulmonary embolism after a blood clot in his leg moved to his lung, while touring America with Back Street Crawler. His body was returned to England and cremated at Golders Green Crematorium in North West London. His epitaph in the Summerhouse there reads: "All right now".

Legacy 
One of Kossoff's signature guitars, a 1957 Fender Stratocaster, was bought and sold after his death by English guitarist Dave Murray of the English heavy metal band Iron Maiden; he used it from 1978 to 1990.

In 2012, one of his most famous and iconic guitars, a 1959 Gibson Les Paul (the Kossoff Burst), was recreated and made into a limited edition reissue by Gibson and named the 'Paul Kossoff 1959 Les Paul Standard'.

In December 2015 Bonhams listed for auction a Gibson Les Paul Standard owned by Kossoff from 1970 to 1976.

In April 2017 Guitar magazine featured the 'stripped' Gibson Les Paul that Kossoff played at the Isle of Wight Festival in 1970. Kossoff sold the guitar to Mike Gooch and in May 1994 it was sold for £12,000 at Christie's.

Selective discography

with Free 

 Tons of Sobs (1968)
 Free (1969)
 Fire and Water (1970)
 Highway (1971)
 Free Live! (1971)
 Free at Last (1972)
 Heartbreaker (1973)
 Songs of Yesterday (Box-Set) (2000)
 Free – Live at the BBC (2006)

Paul Kossoff, Simon Kirke, Tetsu Yamauchi, John "Rabbit" Bundrick 
 Kossoff Kirke Tetsu Rabbit (1972)

with Back Street Crawler 
The Band Plays On (1975)
2nd Street (1976)
Live at Croydon Fairfield Halls 15/6/75 (1983) 2LP
(Note: after Kossoff's death, the band—now called simply 'Crawler'—made further albums)

Solo 
Back Street Crawler (1973)
Koss (1977) 2-LP compilation
Blue Soul (1986) 2-LP compilation

References

Further reading 
 Clayton, David, and Todd K. Smith. Heavy Load: The Story of Free. London: Moonshine Publishing, 2002.  .
 Guerra, Tom. Paul Kossoff – Biography. Paul Kossoff – The Back Street Crawler Vintage Guitar Magazine, 2000.
 James, J.P. Paul Kossoff: All Right Now – The Guitars, The Gear, The Music. Matador, 2017. .

External links 

 Paul Kossoff website
  Paul Kossoff book website
 
 

1950 births
1976 deaths
20th-century English musicians
English rock guitarists
English blues guitarists
English male guitarists
English record producers
English songwriters
English people of Russian-Jewish descent
English Jews
Jewish English musicians
English rock musicians
English blues musicians
Electric blues musicians
Blues rock musicians
British blues (genre) musicians
British rhythm and blues boom musicians
Lead guitarists
People from Hampstead
Musicians from London
Free (band) members
Drug-related deaths in the United States
Golders Green Crematorium
Island Records artists
Back Street Crawler (band) members
20th-century British guitarists
Kossoff family
20th-century British male musicians